Keren Yedaya (born in 1972) is an Israeli filmmaker. She was born in the United States, but her family moved to Israel in 1975 when she was just three. She trained at the Camera Obscura School of Art in Tel Aviv.

Biography
Yedaya is known as a political activist for feminism and women's rights and takes part in protests against Israeli military presence in the West Bank. Her films are reflections of her political activism. She started her career making short films Elinor in 1994 about the tribulations of an Israeli female conscript to the Army, whereas Lulu in 1998 tackles prostitution in Israel. Based on these works, French producer Emmanuel Agneray invited her to France where she shot her third short film Les dessous (in English title Underwear), about a Parisian lingerie and women's wear store.

In 2001, she received from the Montpelier Mediterranean Film Festival financial support for developing a long feature film. The result was her first long feature Or (My Treasure) in 2004 and it won the Caméra d'Or at the Cannes Film Festival. Her follow-up features is Jaffa in 2009, also screened at the Cannes Film Festival.

Her 2014 film That Lovely Girl was selected to compete in the Un Certain Regard section at the 2014 Cannes Film Festival.

Filmography

Director
1994: Elinor (short film)
1999: Lulu (short film)
2001: Les dessous (aka Underwear)
2004: Or (My Treasure)
2009: Jaffa (2009)
2014: That Lovely Girl (2014)
2019: Red FieldsWriter
2001: Les dessous2004: Or (My Treasure)2009: Jaffa (2009)

Awards
2004: Won the "Caméra d'Or" at the Cannes Film Festival for her film Or (My Treasure)''

References

External links

1972 births
Living people
American emigrants to Israel
Israeli film directors
Israeli women film directors
Israeli female screenwriters
Directors of Caméra d'Or winners